The Miniaturist is a 2017 BBC television miniseries adaptation of the debut novel of the same name by Jessie Burton. The series was directed by Guillem Morales and stars Anya Taylor-Joy, Romola Garai and Alex Hassell and first aired in two parts from 26–27 December 2017 on BBC One. In the United States, it aired in three parts from 9–27 September 2018 on PBS's Masterpiece.

Plot
In the 17th-century Netherlands, young Petronella "Nella" Oortman moves into an Amsterdam home that her new husband, Johannes, shares with his sister, Marin, and their two servants Otto and Cornelia. She receives a cold reception from Marin and an indifferent one from Johannes, who provides her with a mysterious cabinet with nine rooms to occupy her time.

Nella writes to a miniaturist to order only three items, and with time she receives multiple of them, without having ordered them, to decorate the cabinet as a doll house. Nella is surprised that each parcel includes a mysterious note as she receives the dolls of her house members predicting something, making it similar to the house they live in.

Johannes has an agreement to sell sugar for Frans. However, Johannes is discovered to be in a long-time same-sex relationship with Jack, a secret which Marin had tried to hide so he could not be punished by the state. Jack tries to attack Marin, but is wounded by Otto. Frans files a complaint claiming that Johannes attempted to murder Jack and forced Jack to be in this relationship, also accusing Johannes of bribery. Johannes tries to escape but is arrested and imprisoned, so the jury decides his fate.

Meanwhile, Marin is found to be pregnant and she tells Nella she was in love with Frans before he married Agnes; however, Marin herself has declined Frans' proposal. Frans becomes negative about Johannes, thinking he declined. Marin passes away after a painful delivery.  The baby is discovered to be Otto's daughter. Nella tries to sell the sugar to a baker who was Cornelia's friend, and bribes some people so she can bury Marin secretly and save her husband of four months from the false charges against him. However, Johannes is sentenced to death by drowning on the charge of being a sodomite, the only one proved.

Nella finds out that The Miniaturist was a girl trying to follow her who vanished when Nella tries to follow back. Nella asks her how could she tell by making dolls what would happen in the Brandt family, but The Miniaturist has no answer for her questions.

Cast and characters
 Anya Taylor-Joy as Petronella "Nella" Brandt:She is married to Johannes, in return for the clearance of debts that her family was liable for after her father's death.
 Romola Garai as Marin Brandt:She is Johannes's sister, and still holds the power in the Brandt household despite Nella moving in until her death.
 Alex Hassell as Johannes Brandt:He is a merchant who sells sugar. His marriage to Nella is to cover his secrets. Nella observes he frequently leaves house instead of spending time with her.
 Hayley Squires as Cornelia, Johannes's servant
 Paapa Essiedu as Otto:He is Johannes's servant and has had an illicit relation with Marin.
 Emily Berrington as The Miniaturist
 Geoffrey Streatfeild as Frans Meermans:He is an up-and-coming businessman, and an "old" friend of Johannes whose friendship ends when his ex-fiance Marin denies to marry him.
 Aislín McGuckin as Agnes Meermans:She is Frans's wife who has invested money in sugar.

In addition, Ziggy Heath plays the character of Jack Philips, who is in gay-relation with Johannes. Christopher Godwin plays the character of Pastor Pellicorne who is a religious leader in Amsterdam, and Ian Hogg plays the character of Pieter Slabbaert who is a schout of Amsterdam.

Episodes

Production
The series was filmed on location in the Netherlands, with Leiden standing in for 17th-century Amsterdam.

Reception

Caroline Framke for Variety praised the beauty of the series, but criticised it as overly long. "It's a shame that the series never quite gels, given how much it has going for it in terms of story, talent, and the truly spectacular production design and costuming that sets off the on location shoots with such style. But just like the dollhouse at its center, The Miniaturist is better at housing facsimiles rather than characters that feel real.

Hanh Nguyen of IndieWire, who graded the series a B, criticised the series for weak character development — which made it seem as though "an episode has gone missing" — but that the series was still worth watching. "Despite Amsterdam thriving during this time, the series examines life in that society from the point of view of the misfits and marginalized. Defiance and bravery are necessary to face the ugliness that is presented, and it's a theme echoed in the characters' actions. The Miniaturist may feel raw and green, sometimes naively so, but in its awkward, otherworldly way champions hope and change, and that's rarely a waste of time."

References

External links
 
 

2017 British television series debuts
2017 British television series endings
2010s British drama television series
English-language television shows
BBC television dramas
2010s British television miniseries